The 2017–18 season was Newport County's fifth consecutive season in Football League Two, 65th season in the Football League and 97th season of league football overall. They finished the season in 11th position in the league, and reached the fourth round of the FA Cup.

Season Review

League
The season began with three away matches in succession, as the Rodney Parade pitch was being relaid. Following 
two draws with Stevenage and Crewe Alexandra County found themselves in 16th place in the embryonic league table, the lowest they would ever be. The first visit to Coventry City since August 1961 resulted in a 1–0 win. In the homecoming game against Chesterfield Newport won 4–1 thanks to a 13-minute Frank Nouble hat-trick and County were now in 2nd place. Over the next 11 games, Newport remained in and around the play-off positions, recording five wins and two draws. However, County failed to record a win in the next four games, falling out of the play-off zone and extending the run to six games without a win in total. After this slump, form improved following the away win at Swindon Town, with only one loss in the next nine games. This included a run of three consecutive wins in January, culminating with a 2–1 win over Crawley Town that put County back in the play-offs in 5th place. This was not to last, as Newport then went winless for the next seven league games before recording their second 2–0 win of the season over Yeovil Town. The last ten games of the season saw only three more County victories, resulting in an 11th-place finish, with doubles over Cambridge United and Swindon Town, and victory over promoted Accrington Stanley along the way. During the season Newport managed the double against Grimsby Town, Crawley Town, Yeovil Town, Swindon Town and Cambridge United.

Cup
In the EFL Cup, County were drawn at home to League One Southend United in the first round. However, the fixture was switched to Roots Hall as the Rodney Parade pitch was still being relaid. County came away with a 2–0 victory as a result of a second-half brace from Shawn McCoulsky and were rewarded with a home draw against Championship side Leeds United. This too had to be switched to the away ground as Rodney Parade was still not ready. Despite taking the lead at Elland Road, County eventually lost 5–1 and were eliminated.

Newport were placed in Southern Group E for the EFL Trophy, alongside Forest Green Rovers, Swansea City U21s and Cheltenham Town. Losing 2–0, 2–1 and 2–1 respectively, County finished bottom of the group and failed to qualify for the knockout stage.

In the FA Cup, County were drawn at home to League One Walsall in the first round. Despite a late Walsall goal, goals from Frank Nouble and Shawn McCoulsky were enough to see Newport into the hat for the second round. County were again drawn at home, this time to fellow League Two side Cambridge United. Goals from captain Joss Labadie in the 2nd and 82nd minute gave Newport a 2–0 victory and passage to the third round. County were drawn at home to Leeds United for the second time this season, and this time the game was played at Rodney Parade. Gaetano Berardi scored in the 9th minute for Leeds, but in the 76th minute, Conor Shaughnessy put the ball into his own net to level the scores. With the clock ticking down to one minute remaining, Shawn McCoulsky leapt highest from a corner to head the winner, putting County into the fourth round for the first time since the 1978–79 season. In the fourth round, County were again drawn at home, this time to Premier League Tottenham Hotspur. In front of a Rodney Parade record crowd, Newport took the lead in the 38th minute courtesy of a Padraig Amond goal. Into the last 10 minutes, County were looking like recording a famous victory, only for Harry Kane to poke home an equaliser from an 82nd-minute corner. In the resulting replay at Wembley, Dan Butler conceded an own goal in the 26th minute, with Spurs' Erik Lamela adding a second on 34 minutes. That was the final score, with the 7,200 County fans in the crowd of 38,947 left to applaud the County players back to the dressing room.

Transfers

Transfers in

Transfers out

Loans in

Loans out

Competitions

Pre-season friendlies
Newport County announced eight pre-season friendlies.

League Two

League table

Result summary

Results by matchday

Fixtures

EFL Cup

EFL Trophy

FA Cup

Squad statistics
Source:

Numbers in parentheses denote appearances as substitute.
Players with squad numbers struck through and marked  left the club during the playing season.
Players with names in italics and marked * were on loan from another club for the whole of their season with Newport County.
Players listed with no appearances have been in the matchday squad but only as unused substitutes.
Key to positions: GK – Goalkeeper; DF – Defender; MF – Midfielder; FW – Forward

References

2017-18
Welsh football clubs 2017–18 season
2017–18 EFL League Two by team